The JCM800 series (Models  2203, 2204, 2205 and 2210) is a line of guitar amplifiers made by Marshall Amplification. The series was introduced in 1981. Although models 1959 and 1987 had been in production since 1965 and the 2203 and 2204 had been in production since 1975, they were redesigned and introduced as JCM800 amplifiers in '81. The JCM800 amplifiers became a staple of 1980s hard rock and heavy metal bands.

History
In 1981, Marshall finally reached the end of its 15-year distribution deal with Rose-Morris, which had severely limited its potential to sell amplifiers outside England; Rose-Morris tagged 55% onto the sticker price for exported models. The JCM800 was the first series produced after the contract expired. The name comes from Jim Marshall's initials, "J.C.M.", coupled with the meaningless "800" from the number plate on his car. It was later noted that "800" stood for the decade. For example, the JCM900 was released in 1990 and the JCM2000 was released in 2000.

The series included head amplifiers with matching cabinets, as well as combos, and was produced until the 1990s. It quickly became a very successful amplifier, and ubiquitous amongst hard rock and heavy metal bands.

Description
These were the second series of Marshalls equipped with a master volume, which allowed for more distortion at lower volumes. Compared to the earlier "Master Volume" series, they offered some advantages, including the possibility to be patched internally and linked with other amplifiers. The first JCM800s were in fact Master Volume amplifiers (Models 2203 and 2204, at 100 and 50 watts respectively), repackaged in new boxes with new panels. Soon, however, the Model 2205 and 2210 appeared on the market. These were equipped with two channels, which could be activated via a foot switch, allowing for separate lead and rhythm sounds. They also had an effects loop and reverb, also a first for Marshall.

Initially, users complained that the amplifiers (used with the standard Marshall cabinets) sounded flat compared to the older Marshalls, until it was discovered (by accident) that the fault was with the speakers: The new cabs had been equipped with a new kind of Celestion speakers. Marshall quickly reverted to the older Celestions. Still, some users prefer the pre-JCM800 amplifiers, claiming that those have a warmer, less "brittle" sound.

The amplifier was equipped with EL34 valves (tubes) for amps sold in the UK and 6550 tubes for amps exported to the United States. The JCM800 is considered a "hot" amplifier because it has more gain stages than comparable amplifiers. There is a difference between the early 2203/2204 and the later dual channel models 2205/2210 models. In their "lead" mode (in the "high" input), an extra clipping diode provides additional gain to the pre-amplifier. This is one of the reasons why many players prefer the early JCM 800 Models 2203/2204 to the 2205/2210, as they are considered to be more organic sounding without the added diode clipping.However, the 2210 and 2205 models were built with a channel bleed, which would let the "clean" channel bleed over into the lead channel if the channel volume is turned to about 7-10. With the right settings, this can create a plexi-style distortion which is great for hard and Punkrock.

Photo gallery

Notable users

 Andy Scott
 Bill Kelliher
 Billy Corgan
 Brett Gurewitz
 Brian Tatler
 Buddy Guy
 C.C. Deville
 Dave Mustaine
 Dino Cazares
 Elliott Randall
 Eric Clapton
 Francis Rossi
 Gary Moore
 Ian MacKaye
 Jason Becker
 James Iha
 James Hetfield
 Jeff Beck
 Jeff Hanneman
 Joey Santiago
 John Frusciante 
 John Norum
 John Sykes
 Johnny Ramone
 Jordan Buckley
 Josh Middleton
 Kerry King
 Kevin Shields
 Kirk Hammett
 Lee Malia
 Leslie West
 Lzzy Hale
 Michael Schenker
 Mick Mars
 Mick Ralphs 
 Kanye West
 Nancy Wilson
 Rick Parfitt
 Ronni Le Tekrø
 Roye Albrighton
 Scott Ian
 Slash
 Mike Mushok
 Steve Cradock
 Steve Rothery
 Tom Morello
 Zakk Wylde
 Steve Jones

References

External links

Instrument amplifiers
Marshall amplifiers
Valve amplifiers